Marcelo Gastón Schilling Rodríguez (born 18 May 1949) is a Chilean politician who was deputy in his country.

References

External links
 BCN Profile

1949 births
Living people
Chilean people of German descent
University of Chile alumni
National Autonomous University of Mexico alumni
Socialist Party of Chile politicians